Huaiqun is a town in Luocheng Mulao Autonomous County, Guangxi, China.

Administrative division
As of 2021, the town is divided into one community and nine villages: 

 Huaiqun Community
 Dong'an
 Si'an
 Jianjiang
 Guogan
 Lundong
 Jiawan
 Xiadong
 Ziqiu
 Gengyao

History
During the Qing dynasty (1644–1911), it was under the jurisdiction of Tianhe County.

It was incorporated as a township in 1925, during the Republic of China. 

Its name was changed to the "Fifth District" in 1952 and then was renamed "Huaiqun People's Commune" in August 1958. It became a township in October 1984 and was upgraded to a town in April 1995.

Geography
The town is located at the west of Luocheng Mulao Autonomous County. The town shares a border with Yizhou District to the west, Jian'an Township to the north, and the town of Tianhe to the east and south.

The Kama Reservoir is located at the north of the town, providing drinking water and water for irrigation for the town.

Climate

Economy
The principal industries in the town are agriculture and mineral resources. The region mainly produce rice, corn, and soybean. Economic crops are mainly sugarcane, cassava, and tobacco.

The region also has an abundance of iron, lead, zinc, phosphorite, silicon dioxide, and calcite.

Demographics

In 2019, Huaiqun had a total population of 23,581 over the whole town.

References

Bibliography

 

Divisions of Luocheng Mulao Autonomous County